Gibberula ardovinii is a species of very small sea snail, a marine gastropod mollusk or micromollusk in the family Cystiscidae.

Description

Distribution

References

External links

Cystiscidae
Gastropods described in 2006